Ángel Amadeo Labruna (28 September 1918 – 19 September 1983) was an Argentine footballer and coach who played as a forward. With 323 goals scored in official matches, which include 294 league goals, Labruna is the 2nd all-time top scorer of Primera División after Paraguayan Arsenio Erico. Labruna was also part of the celebrated River Plate offense, nicknamed La Máquina (The Machine), and he was considered one of the best South-American footballers of his generation. In his career, Labruna scored 564 goals.

Biography
Labruna was born in Buenos Aires.

Career

Playing career

Labruna's debut in the Primera División was in replacement of José Manuel Moreno who had been suspended by the club, wearing the number 10 shirt. The match disputed on 18 June 1939 in La Plata against Estudiantes, which defeated River by 1–0.

His goals scored and outstanding performances caused that Moreno had to play on the right side of the field when he was allowed to play again. Labruna played in River for 20 years, winning 9 domestic championships with the team (1941, 1942, 1945, 1947, 1952, 1953, 1955, 1956, 1957) and being the top scorer twice (1943 with 23 goals and 1945 with 25).

He was part of his club's legendary team along with Juan Carlos Muñoz, José Manuel Moreno, Adolfo Pedernera, and Félix Loustau, where he played as an inside-left forward. Although this attacking line only disputed 18 games with those players, they were regarded as one of the best forward line in the history of Argentine football. They were nicknamed La Máquina (The Machine) due to their skills with the ball and synchronized play. Coach and former player Carlos Peucelle said that his team was formed by "A goalkeeper and 10 forwards", using an imaginary "1–10".

Labruna holds a number of records for River Plate, including his record of 16 goals in the superclásico derby with fierce rival Boca Juniors.

In 1959, Labruna left River Plate having defended club's colors in 515 matches and scoring 317 goals, 293 in goals what made him the all-time highest goalscorer in the Argentine first division along with Arsenio Erico, a record that remains nowadays. He later played two seasons in the Chilean C.S.D. Rangers, and Uruguayan team Rampla Juniors of Montevideo, before returning to Argentina to finish his career at Platense, when he was 43 years old.

Labruna played 37 matches for the Argentina national team, scoring 17 goals. He also won two South American Championships (1946 and 1955) and as a nearly 40-year-old he played in the final phase of 1958 FIFA World Cup held in Sweden.

As other great players of his generation, Labruna could not participate in other World Cups due to the event's suspension during World War II and later for the decision taken by the Argentine Football Association, which did not compete in the World Cups of Brazil and Switzerland.

Coaching career

After ending his career as a player he became Assistant Coach and Coach in River Plate, Defensores de Belgrano, Platense, Rosario Central (where he won his first Nacional championship, in 1971), Talleres de Córdoba, Racing Club, Lanús, Chacarita and Argentinos Juniors.

In 1975 River called Labruna to offer him work as coach. Labruna won two championships that same year, breaking a "curse" of 18 years without titles. Labruna's period in charge of River Plate brought the club much domestic success, a side endowed with players such as Daniel Passarella, Norberto Alonso and Leopoldo Luque.

Personal life
Labruna had two sons, Daniel (died in 1969) and Omar, who worked with Ramón Díaz in River Plate and then coached Olimpo de Bahía Blanca and other teams.

Labruna died on September 19, 1983 from a heart attack, at 64 years old. He is buried at La Chacarita Cemetery in Buenos Aires. Every September 28, River Plate's fans celebrate the "International River Plate Fan's Day" as a tribute to one of the club's greatest idols.

Honours

Player

Club
River Plate
Primera División: 1941, 1942, 1945, 1947, 1952, 1953, 1955, 1956, 1957
Copa Ibarguren: 1937, 1941, 1942
Copa Adrián C. Escobar: 1941
Copa Aldao: 1941, 1945, 1947

International
Argentina
 Campeonato Sudamericano: 1946, 1955

Manager
Rosario Central
 Primera División: Nacional 1971

River Plate'''
 Primera División: Metropolitano 1975, Nacional 1975, Metropolitano 1977, Nacional 1979, Metropolitano 1979, Metropolitano 1980

References

External links

 El Feo Labruna – Tribute webpage 

1918 births
1983 deaths
Footballers from Buenos Aires
Argentine people of Italian descent
Burials at La Chacarita Cemetery
Argentine footballers
Club Atlético River Plate footballers
Club Atlético Platense footballers
Rampla Juniors players
Rangers de Talca footballers
Argentine Primera División players
Argentine expatriate footballers
Expatriate footballers in Chile
Expatriate footballers in Uruguay
1958 FIFA World Cup players
Argentina international footballers
Argentine football managers
Club Atlético River Plate managers
Club Atlético Platense managers
Rosario Central managers
Talleres de Córdoba managers
Racing Club de Avellaneda managers
Club Atlético Lanús managers
Chacarita Juniors managers
Argentinos Juniors managers
Copa América-winning players
Association football forwards